Luis Alberto Cárdenas López (born 15 September 1993), also known as El Mochis, is a Mexican professional footballer who plays as a goalkeeper for Liga MX club Monterrey.

Honours
Monterrey
Liga MX: Apertura 2019
Copa MX: 2019–20
CONCACAF Champions League: 2012–13, 2019, 2021

Mexico Youth
Central American and Caribbean Games: 2014
Pan American Silver Medal: 2015
CONCACAF Olympic Qualifying Championship: 2015

References

External links
 
  
  
 
 
 

1993 births
Living people
Mexican footballers
Association football goalkeepers
C.F. Monterrey players
Club Atlético Zacatepec players
Querétaro F.C. footballers
Liga MX players
Ascenso MX players
Liga Premier de México players
Tercera División de México players
Footballers from Sinaloa
People from Ahome Municipality
Pan American Games silver medalists for Mexico
Footballers at the 2015 Pan American Games
Medalists at the 2015 Pan American Games
Pan American Games medalists in football